The 1989–90 English Hockey League season took place from October 1989 until May 1990.

The Men's National League was sponsored by Poundstretcher and was won by Hounslow. The top four teams qualified to take part in the Poundstretcher League Cup tournament  which was won by Havant.
 
The Women's National League was introduced for the first time   and the inaugural Women's National League title sponsored by Typhoo was won by Slough.

The Men's Hockey Association Cup was won by Havant and the Women's Cup (National Club Championship finals) was won by Sutton Coldfield.

Men's Poundstretcher National League First Division League Standings

Men's League Cup Tournament 

Havant
Jimmy Lewis, David Faulkner, Steve Lawson, Robert Hill, Peter Nail, A Cave, M Coleman (Stuart Avery sub), Russell Garcia, Don Williams, Colin Cooper, R Seabrook
Hounslow
Richard Purvis, Mike Williamson, Jon Potter (capt), Paul Bolland, Guy Swayne, Martyn Grimley, David Hacker, Andy Ferns, Nick Gordon (Parmi Soor sub), Robert Thompson, Jon Rees

Women's Typhoo National League First Division League Standings

Men's Nationwide Anglia Cup (Hockey Association Cup)

Quarter-finals

Semi-finals

Final 
(Held at Luton on 8 April)

Havant
Sean Rowlands, David Faulkner, A Cave, Robert Hill, Peter Nail, Steve Lawson, M Coleman (Gary Roberts sub), Russell Garcia, Don Williams, Colin Cooper (Stuart Avery sub), R Seabrook 
Stourport
S Taylor, J Lee, N Chaudry, R Lee, J Roberts, D Bleach, G Carlisle, John McPhun (P Harradine sub), David Knott, A Watson (R Jones sub), Imran Sherwani

Women's Cup (National Clubs Championship finals)

Group A

Group B

Semi-finals

Final 
(Held at Bournemouth Sports Centre on 22 April)

References 

1989
field hockey
field hockey
1989 in field hockey
1990 in field hockey